James Munro was a British convict who was transported to Australia, and established himself as a farmer on Preservation Island, Tasmania, and community leader of the region's community of European seal hunters, known as "King of the Eastern Straits.

Munro established himself on the island, with himself and his varying female partners being its only inhabitants. There he built structures, raised livestock, and harvested the meat and eggs of mutton birds.

Munro was appointed local constable in 1825, and opposed George Augustus Robinson's attempts to prevent relationships between sealers and Aboriginal women. It is still disputed as to the consensuality of these relationships, with some arguing that the relationships were often voluntary and mutually beneficial, but Munro was also accused of leading sealers in raiding parties to capture Aboriginal women in 1830.

See also 

 George Briggs (sealer)

References

1779 births
1845 deaths
Settlers of Tasmania